Mungo Thomson (born 1969, Woodland, California) is a contemporary visual artist based in Los Angeles.

Education
Thomson attended the Whitney Museum Independent Study Program and the UCLA MFA program, where he gained a master of fine arts degree.

Career and works
Thomson has had solo exhibitions at the UCLA Hammer Museum, Los Angeles (2008); the Kadist Art Foundation, Paris (2007); and Galleria d’Arte Moderna e Contemporanea (GAMeC), Bergamo, Italy (2006). He participated in the Istanbul Biennial (2011), the Whitney Biennial (2008), and the Performa Biennial of Visual Art Performance (2005). His book Font Study (TIME) was published by Los Angeles County Museum of Art (2011), The White Album was published by RITE Editions (2008), and Negative Space was published by Christoph Keller Editions and JRP|Ringier (2006). Thomson self-published the comic book Einstein #1 in 2008.

In 2012 Thompson created a helium-filled copy of a sculpture by Michael Heizer, for an official Fourth of July float for the Aspen Art Museum.

Family
Thomson's father is psychiatrist Captane "Cap" Thomson, beloved "Doctoring 3" preceptor at UC Davis Medical School.

References

External links
 mungothomson.com
Mungo Thomson's profile at Kadist Art Foundation

1969 births
Living people
American conceptual artists
Artists from California